The Space Solar Power Exploratory Research and Technology program (SERT) program, conducted by NASA, was initiated by John C. Mankins and led by Joe Howell in March 1999 for the following purpose:
 Perform design studies of selected flight demonstration concepts;
 Evaluate studies of the general feasibility, design, and requirements.
 Create conceptual designs of subsystems that make use of advanced SSP technologies to benefit future space or terrestrial applications.
 Formulate a preliminary plan of action for the U.S. (working with international partners) to undertake an aggressive technology initiative.
 Construct technology development and demonstration roadmaps for critical Space Solar Power (SSP) elements.  It was to develop a solar power satellite (SPS) concept for a future gigawatt space power systems to provide electrical power by converting the Sun’s energy and beaming it to the Earth's surface. It was also to provide a developmental path to solutions for current space power architectures. Subject to studies it proposed an inflatable photovoltaic gossamer structure with concentrator lenses or solar dynamic engines to convert solar flux into electricity. The initial program looked at systems in sun-synchronous orbit, but by the end of the program, most of the analysis looked at geosynchronousing unimaginably large initial investments in fixed infrastructure before the emplacement of productive power plants can begin.
 Space solar power systems appear to possess many significant environmental advantages when compared to alternative approaches.
 The economic viability of space solar power systems depends on many factors and the successful development of various new technologies (not least of which is the availability of exceptionally low cost access to space) however, the same can be said of many other advanced power technologies options.
 Space solar power may well emerge as a serious candidate among the options for meeting the energy demands of the 21st century.

Program
Model System Categories (MSCs) were defined and ranged from relatively small-scale demonstrations to very large-scale operational SPS systems. In broad terms, each MSC represented an idea of what scale, technology, missions, etc. might be achievable in a particular future timeframe. The technology investment plan uses a time phased methodology to develop hardware and systems starting at 600 volts, followed by 10,000 V, and ending with 100,000 V to spread development and testing infrastructure costs over the life of the program rather than incur them from the beginning. The 600 V technology had immediate application for the NASA Advanced Space Transportation Program (ASTP).

 2005: ~100 kW, Free-flyer, demo-scale commercial space
 2010: ~100 kW Planetary Surface System, demo-scale, space exploration
 2015: ~10 MW Free-flyer, Transportation; Large demo, solar clipper
 2020: 1 GW Free-flyer, Full-scale solar power satellite commercial space

Solar power generation
Current solar cells were considered too heavy, expensive and hard to deploy. Flexible thin film cells promised one viable future option for low mass, low cost, and high production capability by depositing special materials in very thin (micrometers) layers. Flexibility promotes deposition on lightweight inflatable structures needed for packaging large arrays in launch vehicles. The materials considered (kapton) did not have the high temperature properties needed to allow cell growth deposition so development of a low temperature growth process for thin film solar cells was pursued. In the year 2000 the production of 5% efficient prototype small-area cells was followed by a 10% efficient prototype on kapton.

Very high efficiency photovoltaics
Two longer range investigations into high efficiency solar cells was undertaken. 1) "Rainbow" cells to be tailored to the wavelengths of specific ranges of sunlight focused through a prism. 2) An ensemble of quantum dots in a size range to capture most of the radiation from the solar energy spectrum. The collection would be equivalent to an array of semiconductors individually size tuned for optimal absorption at their bandgaps throughout the solar energy emission spectrum. Theoretical efficiencies were in the range of 50–70%.

High voltage arc mitigation
The arrays for an SSP platform would have to operate at 1000 volt or higher, as compared to the current International Space Station's 160 vVphotovoltaic arrays. Development of design and manufacturing techniques to prevent 1000 V self-destructive arcing continued. Several arc mitigation techniques were evaluated. Samples incorporating the most promising techniques were acquired and tested to achieve a non-arcing "rad" hard high voltage (greater than 300 V) array. Initial development was performed at 300 V to utilize existing facilities and equipment.

Solar dynamics
Solar Dynamic (SD) power systems concentrate sunlight into a receiver where the energy is transferred to a heat engine for conversion to electrical power. Brayton heat engines utilize a turbine, compressor, and rotary alternator to produce power using an inert gas working fluid. Such a system was devised for use on an SSP.

Cost, mass, and technical risk of various Solar Power Generation (SPG) options for a solar dynamic system were studied. For a 10MW SD system, at high power levels this technology was shown to be competitive with projected photovoltaic systems. Testing was performed to determine the characterization of high temperature secondary concentrator refractive materials in an SD environment. A prototype refractive secondary concentrator with a concentration ratio of 10:1 was designed. This, combined with a primary concentrator of 1000:1 would result in a very high 10,000:1 ratio which permits a reasonable pointing accuracy requirement of 0.1°. The performance of the sapphire concentrator was evaluated via an on-sun calorimeter test.

Power management & distribution
Power Management and Distribution (PMAD) covers the entire power system between the source or power generator and the load, which in this case is the transmitter. Studies were being conducted to determine sensible technologies this size and scope. All of the switches, conductors and converters were immense compared to current spacecraft. Questions such as using alternating current vs. direct current power distribution, grounding schemes, standard current conductors vs. high and/or low temperature superconductors, system voltage level vs. environmental arcing mitigation strategies, types of power converters and system protection devices, and high temperature radiation resistant circuit elements. Results were to be published by the Systems Analysis and Technology Working Group (SATWG) at the culmination of FY 98–99 SERT. Meanwhile, technologies were selected, wherever possible, to leverage other government technology investigations:

Superconductors
A contracted study was continued for the implementation of superconductors on the SSP. Initial studies showed that transmission voltages could be reduced to less than 300 Volts, mitigating arcing effects. Superconductor complications included cryogenic cooling systems with armor to protect against micrometeoroid impact and specialized connectors at segment, switch and power converter interfaces. It was shown that the tremendous magnetic repulsion force (on the order of 3.5 MT/meter radially at 1 Megamp) could be used for deployment and to present an extremely rigid structure.

Silicon carbide power electronics
Silicon carbide technologies leading to power devices continued to be pursued. This leveraged work previously funded to develop defect free and thick SiC epitaxial substrates. Although substrates could currently be manufactured with acceptably small numbers of micropipe defects, the next goal was to reduce other defects that can harm the performance of power devices. An objective was to demonstrate the high temperature operation of high-voltage SiC diodes, MOSFETs, and JFETs in a DC-DC power converter and develop models for predicting the influence of defects on device performance.

Milestones/products 1999: Demonstrated a 2 kW SiC thyristor operating at 300 °C; breadboarded 300 V switch and 600 V switch; completed dynamic characterization of SiC thyristors. 2000: Completed converter topology vs. device study with a breadboard converter prototype; Tested 600 V/100 A solid body fuse.

Ion thrusters
Ion thrusters are an enabling technology for SSP Low Earth Orbit (LEO) to Geostationary Orbit (GEO) orbit transfer and station keeping. Studies showed that advanced electric propulsion can provide a factor of 5 increase in payload for Earth to orbit transfer when compared to storable biprop and cryogenic biprop thrusters; payload mass that normally would be manifested for propellant. Comparisons made to gridded ion thrusters, magnetoplasmadynamic and pulsed inductive thrusters showed that Hall thruster technology provides overall greater benefits, including quicker trip times, good power density, a good contemporary technology base and good flight history, all translating into commercial industry acceptance. Advances such as direct power drive from the solar arrays and single and/or two-stage operation will allow payloads of 13 to 15 metric tons per 20 metric tons to LEO from launch as opposed to only 2 metric tons using chemical propulsion. Trip times from LEO to GEO are also reasonable at 120 to 230 days depending on performance setpoint. The proposed Hall thruster system consisted of four 50 kW krypton Hall thrusters directly driven from a 200 kW solar array. The propulsion system will be included on each SSP segment. Performance required from the Hall thruster units is 2000 to 3500 sec ISP with an overall system efficiency of 52% to 57%. Due to the mass of fuel required to place the entire system into geostationary orbit, propellants besides xenon (normally used), such as krypton and noble gas mixtures were proposed. Additional work on alternative fuels would eventually need to be conducted.

In 2000: tested high power Hall thruster; evaluated 1st generation domestic 50 kW breadboard engine in GRC high power Hall thruster test bed and high current cathode development

See also
 Brayton cycle
 Future energy development
 Heat engine
 Ion thruster
 Photovoltaics
 Rankine cycle
 Satellite
 Solar cell
 Solar power
 Solar power satellite
 Stirling cycle
 Superconductor

References
 Space Solar Power Satellite Technology Development at the Glenn Research Center—An Overview James E. Dudenhoefer and Patrick J. George, NASA Glenn Research Center, Cleveland, Ohio
 Reinventing the Solar Power Satellite", NASA 2004-212743, Geoffrey A. Landis, NASA Glenn Research Center
 J. Howell and J.C. Mankins, "Preliminary results from NASA's Space Solar Power Exploratory Research and Technology Program," 51st International Astronautical Congress, Rio de Janeiro, Brazil, 2000.
 H. Feingold and C. Carrington, "Evaluation and comparison of space solar power concepts," 53rd International Astronautical Federation Congress.  Acta Astronautica. Vol. 53, 4–10, August–November 2003, pp. 547–559.

External links
 Solar Dynamic Power (SDP) Overview from NASA Glenn Research Center

NASA programs
Solar power and space